Alta–Aurelia Community School District is a public school district with offices in Alta and Aurelia in Iowa.

The district, which serves Alta and Aurelia, covers sections of Buena Vista and Cherokee counties, with a very small section in Sac County.

It was created on July 1, 2018, as the merger of the Alta Community School District and the Aurelia Community School District, though they had previously shared high school sports. The merger was approved 178–55 in Aurelia and 257–8 in Alta during a September 2017 election.

Schools
 Alta–Aurelia High School - Alta
 Alta–Aurelia Middle School - Aurelia
 Alta Elementary School
 Aurelia Elementary School

Alta–Aurelia High School

Athletics
The Warriors compete in the Twin Lakes Conference in the following sports:

Cross country 
Volleyball 
Football 
Basketball
Wrestling 
Track and field
Golf 
 Boys' 1990 Class 3A State Champions
 Girls' 3-time Class 2A State Champions (2013, 2015, 2016)
Baseball 
Softball

See also
List of school districts in Iowa
List of high schools in Iowa

References

Further reading

External links
 Alta-Aurelia Community School District

School districts established in 2018
2018 establishments in Iowa
School districts in Iowa
Education in Buena Vista County, Iowa
Education in Cherokee County, Iowa
Education in Sac County, Iowa